Fordoche (pronounced four-DOASH) is a town in Pointe Coupee Parish, Louisiana, United States. The population was 928 at the 2010 census. It is part of the Baton Rouge Metropolitan Statistical Area.

History
In 1854, the first post office was established at Fordoche, with Thomas Farrar designated as its first postmaster.  There are two conflicting stories about how the town's name was derived.  One story is that it received its name from a Caddo Indian word meaning "wild animal lair" (i.e., the bed of a wild beast) and the other suggests that it is named after a Louisiana French term for underbrush found in bayou bottom.

At least two American Civil War battles were fought in and around Fordoche.  The Battle of Fordoche Bridge was fought in September 1863. Union troops were sent to prevent the Confederacy from operating in the upper Atchafalaya but the Confederates were successful in driving back the Union forces.

In May 1864, the Confederates were again victorious over the Union troops at the "Skirmish on Bayou Fordoche Road".

The area saw an influx of Italian immigrants after 1890.

Fordoche is the youngest incorporated community in Pointe Coupee Parish. It was incorporated as a village in 1961 and became a town in 1994.

Geography
Fordoche is located at  (30.591445, -91.608546).

Major Highways 
Louisiana Highway 77
Louisiana Highway 81

Demographics

As of the census of 2000, there were 933 people, 341 households, and 285 families residing in the town. The racial makeup of the town was 90.68% White, 8.57% African American, 0.11% Asian, and 0.64% from two or more races. Hispanic or Latino of any race were 0.75% of the population.

There were 341 households, out of which 37.0% had children under the age of 18 living with them, 72.4% were married couples living together, 6.5% had a female householder with no husband present, and 16.4% were non-families. 13.8% of all households were made up of individuals, and 5.0% had someone living alone who was 65 years of age or older. The average household size was 2.74 and the average family size was 2.99.

In the town, the population was spread out, with 25.3% under the age of 18, 8.7% from 18 to 24, 28.3% from 25 to 44, 24.0% from 45 to 64, and 13.7% who were 65 years of age or older. The median age was 37 years. For every 100 females, there were 99.4 males. For every 100 females age 18 and over, there were 103.2 males.

The median income for a household in the town was $36,364, and the median income for a family was $40,313. Males had a median income of $32,400 versus $21,146 for females. The per capita income for the town was $15,223. About 12.1% of families and 14.8% of the population were below the poverty line, including 16.6% of those under age 18 and 20.3% of those age 65 or over.

See also
Fordoche Interactive Map

References

Towns in Pointe Coupee Parish, Louisiana
Towns in Louisiana
Baton Rouge metropolitan area